Haplorchis taichui is a species of intestinal fluke in the family Heterophyidae. It is a human parasite.

Distribution
This species occurs in: Taiwan, the Philippines, Bangladesh, India, Sri Lanka, Palestine, Iraq, Egypt, Malaysia, Thailand, Laos, Vietnam, and South China.

Life cycle
The first intermediate hosts of Heterophyes nocens include freshwater snails Melania obliquegranosa, Stenomelania juncea, and Melanoides tuberculata.

The second intermediate host include freshwater fish: Cyclocheilichthys repasson, goldfish Carassius auratus, Cyprinus carpio, Gambusia affinis, Hampala dispar, Labiobarbus leptocheilus, Puntius binotatus, Puntius brevis, Puntius gonionotus, Javean barb, Barbodes palata, Pseudorasbora parva, Rhodeus ocellatus, Zacco platypus, Raiamas guttatus, Mystacoleucus marginatus, and Siamese mud carp Henicorhynchus siamensis.

Natural definitive hosts are fish-eating animals: dogs, cats, birds, and humans.

Effects on human health

Symptoms

Diagnosis and treatment
Oxyresveratrol, a stilbenoid found in extracts of Artocarpus lakoocha is effective against Haplorchis taichui.

References

External links 
 

Heterophyidae
Animals described in 1924